Ronald Mathews (December 2, 1935 in New York City – June 28, 2008 in Brooklyn) was an American jazz pianist who worked with Max Roach from 1963 to 1968 and Art Blakey's Jazz Messengers. He acted as lead in recording from 1963 and 1978–79. His most recent work was in 2008, as both a mentor and musician with Generations, a group of jazz musicians headed by veteran drummer Jimmy Cobb. He contributed two new compositions for the album that was released by San Francisco State University's International Center for the Arts on September 15, 2008.

Critics have compared him to pianists Thelonious Monk, Bud Powell, and McCoy Tyner.

Biography
In his twenties, Mathews toured internationally and recorded with Roach, Freddie Hubbard and Roy Haynes. He was also a member of Art Blakey's Jazz Messengers in the late 1950s through the 1960s. By thirty, he began teaching jazz piano and led workshops, clinics and master classes at Long Island University in New York City. Besides Dexter Gordon and Clark Terry, he toured and recorded on two Louis Hayes projects in the 70's (i.e. the Louis Hayes-Woody Shaw Quintet and the Louis Hayes-Junior Cook Quintet).

One of the highlights of his career, and one of his longest associations, was with the Johnny Griffin Quartet. For almost five years (1978-1982) he was an integral part of this band and forged lasting relationships with Griffin, Kenny Washington (drums) and Ray Drummond (bass). The New York Times described Mathews as "a constant and provocative challenge to Mr. Griffin. [...He] is the energizer of the group". One of the few Johnny Griffin recordings that features Mathews' original compositions is "To the Ladies" (Galaxy).

In the 1980s, Mathews began honing his role as a front man. He performed as a leader in duo, trio and quartet configurations around the world (from New York City to Genova, to the North Sea Jazz Festival in the Netherlands, and more). He also toured with Freddie Hubbard and Dizzy Gillespie's United Nations Band. Mathews was also involved in cross-media projects: he was pianist for the Tony Award winning Broadway musical, Black and Blue in 1989, and, in 1990, he was one of the artists who recorded for Spike Lee's movie, Mo' Better Blues.

After a stint touring and recording with the Clifford Jordan Big Band in the early 1990s, Mathews joined T.S. Monk for eight years of touring and recording. The Chicago Tribune stated that "The soul of the band [...] is pianist Ronnie Mathews, whose angular romanticism provides the horn players with a lush and spicy foundation for their improvising". Three albums were recorded with the T.S. Monk, Jr. Band, including Charm. Mathews died of pancreatic cancer on June 28, 2008 in Brooklyn.

In 1998, Hal Leonard Books published his collection of student arrangements: "Easy Piano of Thelonious Monk".

Discography

As leader
 1963: Doin' the Thang! (Prestige) with Freddie Hubbard
 1975: Trip to the Orient (East Wind) with Louis Hayes, Yoshio Suzuki
 1978: Roots, Branches & Dances (Bee Hive) with Ray Drummond, Al Foster, Frank Foster, Azzedin Weston
 1979: Legacy (Bee Hive) with Ricky Ford, Bill Hardman, Walter Booker, Jimmy Cobb
 1980: Song for Leslie (Red) with Ray Drummond, Kenny Washington
 1985: So Sorry Please (Nilva) with Ray Drummond, Alvin Queen
 1988: Selena's Dance (Timeless) with Stafford James, Tony Reedus
 1989: At Cafe Des Copains (Sackville)
 1990: Dark Before the Dawn (DIW) with Ray Drummond, Billy Higgins
 1992: Lament for Love (DIW) with David Williams, Frank Gant
 1995: Shades of Monk
 2001: Once I Love with Walter Booker, Alvin Queen
 2008: Fortuna with Roni Ben-Hur

As sideman
With Roland Alexander
Pleasure Bent (Prestige New Jazz 1961)
With Art Blakey and the Jazz Messengers
Live! at Slug's NYC (1968)  (Everest 1977 as Art Blakey and the Jazz Messengers)
Moanin' (Live) (Laserlight CD 1997) (completely different tunes than Slug's)   
With Thomas Chapin
I've Got Your Number (Arabesque, 1993)
With Larry Coryell
New High (HighNote, 2000)
With Kenny Dorham
The Flamboyan Queens NY 1963 (Uptown CD 2009) with Joe Henderson
With Teddy Edwards
Ladies Man (HighNote, 2000)
With Dexter Gordon
Homecoming: Live at the Village Vanguard (2 LPs Columbia 1976)
With Johnny Griffin
Return of the Griffin (Galaxy 1978)
NYC Underground (Galaxy 1979)
To the Ladies (Galaxy 1980)
Live / Autumn Leaves (Recorded 1980-1981) (Polydor Gitanes CD 1997)
With Bill Hardman 
Saying Something (Savoy 1961)
With Louis Hayes
Breath of Life (Muse, 1974)
Ichi-Ban (Timeless, 1976) with Junior Cook Woody Shaw
The Real Thing (Muse, 1977)
Blue Lou (SteepleChase, 1993)
With Roy Haynes
 Cracklin' (New Jazz, 1963) with Booker Ervin
 Cymbalism (New Jazz, 1963) with Frank Strozier
With Joe Henderson
 Big Band (Verve, 1997)
With Freddie Hubbard
 Breaking Point! (Blue Note, 1965)
 At Jazz Jamboree Warszawa '91: A Tribute to Miles (Sunburst, 1991)
With Sam Jones
 Visitation (Steeplechase 1979)
With Clifford Jordan 
Play What You Feel (Mapleshade, 1990 [1997])
Down Through the Years (Milestone, 1991)
With T. S. Monk
Take One (Blue Note, 1992)
Changing of the Guard (Blue Note, 1993)
The Charm (Blue Note, 1995)
Monk on Monk (N2K, 1997)
With Frank Morgan
Mood Indigo (Antilles, 1989)
Reflections (HighNote, 2006)
With Lee Morgan
 The Rumproller (Blue Note, 1965)
With Sal Nistico
 Neo/Nistico (Bee Hive, 1978)
With Charlie Persip 
 Charles Persip and the Jazzstatesmen (Bethlehem 1960) 
With Max Roach
 Drums Unlimited (Atlantic, 1965)
With Woody Shaw
 Little Red's Fantasy (Muse, 1976)
 The Woody Shaw Concert Ensemble at the Berliner Jazztage (Muse, 1976)
 The Tour – Volume One (HighNote, 2016)
With James Spaulding
Blues Nexus (Muse, 1993)
With Sonny Stitt
 Rearin' Back (Argo, 1962)
 Primitivo Soul! (Prestige, 1963)

References

External links
 [ All Music]

1935 births
2008 deaths
American jazz pianists
American male pianists
Musicians from New York City
20th-century American pianists
Jazz musicians from New York (state)
20th-century American male musicians
American male jazz musicians